The Gilberd School is a coeducational secondary school with academy status, in Colchester, Essex, England.

History
The school originally opened on 12 July 1912 in buildings on North Hill, Colchester. During the 1930s the school became known as the North East Essex Technical College and School of Art; in 1959 the college was renamed the Gilberd County Technical School after Dr William Gilberd (also known as William Gilbert). The School of Art became the Colchester Institute.

The school was one of three Grammar Schools in Colchester: the Royal Grammar School (boys), Colchester County High School (girls) and the Gilberd School (co-educational). Educational reorganisation made all schools co-educational while also turning the Gilberd School into a Comprehensive. Since 1987 the site has been used as Colchester Sixth Form College, and the school is based in Brinkley Lane in the Highwoods area of the town.

The school converted to academy status on 1 March 2012.

Academic results 
The school's 2016 GCSE results were above the national average, with a Progress 8 score of 0.17. 67% of students achieved grades A*-C in GCSE English and Mathematics.

Notable former pupils

Alex Gilbey, footballer
James Raven, historian
Dave Rowntree, musician, politician, solicitor, composer and animator

References

External links

Secondary schools in Essex
Educational institutions established in 1912
1912 establishments in England
Academies in Essex
Schools in Colchester (town)